Princess Siribha Chudabhorn of Thailand (born 8 October 1982), commonly known as Princess Ribha, is the eldest daughter of Princess Chulabhorn Walailak and Virayudh Tishyasarin.

Early life
Princess Siribha Chudabhorn was born on 8 October 1982 at Chitralada Royal Villa in Bangkok. She is eldest daughter of Princess Chulabhorn of Thailand and her husband Virayudh Tishyasarin. She has an only sister, Princess Aditayadorn Kitikhun. In 1997, she met Damon Albarn at a Blur concert in Bangkok. That meeting later inspired the song "Baby Queen" from the 2023 album Cracker Island by the Albarn-fronted virtual band Gorillaz.

Education
Princess Siribha Chudabhorn received a bachelor's degree in Visual Arts and a master's degree in Thai Arts from the Faculty of Painting, Sculpture and Graphic Arts, Silpakorn University.

Career
Princess Siribha Chudabhorn is the president of Siribha Chudabhorn Volunteer Aviation Agency, specialising in conservation and evacuation, volunteering to help citizens in need from the problems of drought, flood, etc.

Honours

 :
 Dame Grand Cross of the Order of Chula Chom Klao, First Class
 Dame Grand Cordon of the Order of the White Elephant
 Dame Grand Cordon of the Order of the Crown of Thailand
 Recipient of the King Bhumibol Cypher Badge Medal
 Recipient of the Commemorative Medal on the Occasion of the Coronation of H.M. King Rama X
 Recipient of the King Vajiralongkorn Royal Cypher Badge Medal

Ancestry

See also 
 King Bhumibol Adulyadej

References

External links

1982 births
Living people
Thai female Phra Ong Chao
Siribha Chudabhorn
Siribha Chudabhorn
20th-century Chakri dynasty
21st-century Chakri dynasty